Thomas Edwards (Caerfallwch, 1779–1858), was a Welsh writer and lexicographer born in Northop, Flintshire, Wales. He wrote an Analysis of Welsh Orthography and an English and Welsh Dictionary.

Life and writings
At the age of 14, Edwards was apprenticed to a saddler named Birch, in whose family he cultivated his taste for Welsh-language literature. He married in 1801 or 1802. He moved to London and became a secretary to Nathaniel M. Rothschild.

In 1838, Edwards was appointed with five others to improve Welsh orthography, in connection with the Abergavenny Eisteddfod. In 1845 he published his Analysis of Welsh Orthography. For many years he was a member of the Cymmrodorion and delivered several lectures there. One of them, entitled "Currency", later appeared in print. In addition, he was a frequent contributor to Welsh magazines.

Dictionary
Edwards's most notable work was his English and Welsh Dictionary, published by Evans of Holywell, Flintshire in 1850. A second edition appeared in 1864, and then another in the United States. It is considered by some to be the best dictionary of the Welsh language.

Death

Thomas Edwards died at 10 Cloudesley Square, London, on 4 June 1858. He was interred in a family grave in Highgate Cemetery, near the top end on the western side.

References

1779 births
1858 deaths
Burials at Highgate Cemetery
19th-century Welsh writers
19th-century Welsh people
People from Northop